Research concerning the relationship between the thermodynamic quantity entropy and both the origin and evolution of life began around the turn of the 20th century. In 1910, American historian Henry Adams printed and distributed to university libraries and history professors the small volume A Letter to American Teachers of History proposing a theory of history based on the second law of thermodynamics and on the principle of entropy.

The 1944 book What is Life? by Nobel-laureate physicist Erwin Schrödinger stimulated further research in the field. In his book, Schrödinger originally stated that life feeds on negative entropy, or negentropy as it is sometimes called, but in a later edition corrected himself in response to complaints and stated that the true source is free energy. More recent work has restricted the discussion to Gibbs free energy because biological processes on Earth normally occur at a constant temperature and pressure, such as in the atmosphere or at the bottom of the ocean, but not across both over short periods of time for individual organisms.

Ideas about the relationship between entropy and living organisms have inspired hypotheses and speculations in many contexts, including psychology, information theory, the origin of life, and the possibility of extraterrestrial life.

Early views
In 1863, Rudolf Clausius published his noted memoir On the Concentration of Rays of Heat and Light, and on the Limits of Its Action, wherein he outlined a preliminary relationship, based on his own work and that of William Thomson (Lord Kelvin), between living processes and his newly developed concept of entropy. Building on this, one of the first to speculate on a possible thermodynamic perspective of organic evolution was the Austrian physicist Ludwig Boltzmann. In 1875, building on the works of Clausius and Kelvin, Boltzmann reasoned:

In 1876, American civil engineer Richard Sears McCulloh, in his Treatise on the Mechanical Theory of Heat and its Application to the Steam-Engine, which was an early thermodynamics textbook, states, after speaking about the laws of the physical world, that "there are none that are established on a firmer basis than the two general propositions of Joule and Carnot; which constitute the fundamental laws of our subject." McCulloh then goes on to show that these two laws may be combined in a single expression as follows:

where

 entropy
 a differential amount of heat passed into a thermodynamic system
 absolute temperature

McCulloh then declares that the applications of these two laws, i.e. what are currently known as the first law of thermodynamics and the second law of thermodynamics, are innumerable:

McCulloh gives a few of what he calls the "more interesting examples" of the application of these laws in extent and utility. His first example is physiology, wherein he states that "the body of an animal, not less than a steamer, or a locomotive, is truly a heat engine, and the consumption of food in the one is precisely analogous to the burning of fuel in the other; in both, the chemical process is the same: that called combustion." He then incorporates a discussion of Antoine Lavoisier's theory of respiration with cycles of digestion, excretion, and perspiration, but then contradicts Lavoisier with recent findings, such as internal heat generated by friction, according to the new theory of heat, which, according to McCulloh, states that the "heat of the body generally and uniformly is diffused instead of being concentrated in the chest". McCulloh then gives an example of the second law, where he states that friction, especially in the smaller blood vessels, must develop heat. Undoubtedly, some fraction of the heat generated by animals is produced in this way. He then asks: "but whence the expenditure of energy causing that friction, and which must be itself accounted for?"

To answer this question he turns to the mechanical theory of heat and goes on to loosely outline how the heart is what he calls a "force-pump", which receives blood and sends it to every part of the body, as discovered by William Harvey, and which "acts like the piston of an engine and is dependent upon and consequently due to the cycle of nutrition and excretion which sustains physical or organic life". It is likely that McCulloh modeled parts of this argument on that of the famous Carnot cycle. In conclusion, he summarizes his first and second law argument as such:

Negative entropy
In the 1944 book What is Life?, Austrian physicist Erwin Schrödinger, who in 1933 had won the Nobel Prize in Physics, theorized that life – contrary to the general tendency dictated by the second law of thermodynamics, which states that the entropy of an isolated system tends to increase – decreases or keeps constant its entropy by feeding on negative entropy. The problem of organization in living systems increasing despite the second law is known as the Schrödinger paradox. In his note to Chapter 6 of What is Life?, however, Schrödinger remarks on his usage of the term negative entropy:

This, Schrödinger argues, is what differentiates life from other forms of the organization of matter. In this direction, although life's dynamics may be argued to go against the tendency of the second law, life does not in any way conflict with or invalidate this law, because the principle that entropy can only increase or remain constant applies only to a closed system which is adiabatically isolated, meaning no heat can enter or leave, and the physical and chemical processes which make life possible do not occur in adiabatic isolation, i.e. living systems are open systems. Whenever a system can exchange either heat or matter with its environment, an entropy decrease of that system is entirely compatible with the second law.

Schrödinger asked the question: "How does the living organism avoid decay?" The obvious answer is: "By eating, drinking, breathing and (in the case of plants) assimilating." While energy from nutrients is necessary to sustain an organism's order, Schrödinger also presciently postulated the existence of other molecules equally necessary for creating the order observed in living organisms: "An organism's astonishing gift of concentrating a stream of order on itself and thus escaping the decay into atomic chaos – of drinking orderliness from a suitable environment – seems to be connected with the presence of the aperiodic solids..." We now know that this "aperiodic" crystal is DNA, and that its irregular arrangement is a form of information. "The DNA in the cell nucleus contains the master copy of the software, in duplicate. This software seems to control by specifying an algorithm, or set of instructions, for creating and maintaining the entire organism containing the cell."

DNA and other macromolecules determine an organism's life cycle: birth, growth, maturity, decline, and death. Nutrition is necessary but not sufficient to account for growth in size, as genetics is the governing factor. At some point, virtually all organisms normally decline and die even while remaining in environments that contain sufficient nutrients to sustain life. The controlling factor must be internal and not nutrients or sunlight acting as causal exogenous variables. Organisms inherit the ability to create unique and complex biological structures; it is unlikely for those capabilities to be reinvented or to be taught to each generation. Therefore, DNA must be operative as the prime cause in this characteristic as well. Applying Boltzmann's perspective of the second law, the change of state from a more probable, less ordered, and higher entropy arrangement to one of less probability, more order, and lower entropy (as is seen in biological ordering) calls for a function like that known of DNA. DNA's apparent information-processing function provides a resolution of the Schrödinger paradox posed by life and the entropy requirement of the second law.

Gibbs free energy and biological evolution
In recent years, the thermodynamic interpretation of evolution in relation to entropy has begun to utilize the concept of the Gibbs free energy, rather than entropy. This is because biological processes on Earth take place at roughly constant temperature and pressure, a situation in which the Gibbs free energy is an especially useful way to express the second law of thermodynamics. The Gibbs free energy is given by:

where

 Gibbs free energy
 enthalpy passed into a thermodynamic system
 absolute temperature
 entropy

The minimization of the Gibbs free energy is a form of the principle of minimum energy, which follows from the entropy maximization principle for closed systems. Moreover, the Gibbs free energy equation, in modified form, can be utilized for open systems when chemical potential terms are included in the energy balance equation. In a popular 1982 textbook, Principles of Biochemistry, noted American biochemist Albert Lehninger argued that the order produced within cells as they grow and divide is more than compensated for by the disorder they create in their surroundings in the course of growth and division. In short, according to Lehninger, "Living organisms preserve their internal order by taking from their surroundings free energy, in the form of nutrients or sunlight, and returning to their surroundings an equal amount of energy as heat and entropy."

Similarly, according to the chemist John Avery, from his 2003 book Information Theory and Evolution, we find a presentation in which the phenomenon of life, including its origin and evolution, as well as human cultural evolution, has its basis in the background of thermodynamics, statistical mechanics, and information theory. The (apparent) paradox between the second law of thermodynamics and the high degree of order and complexity produced by living systems, according to Avery, has its resolution "in the information content of the Gibbs free energy that enters the biosphere from outside sources." Assuming evolution drives organisms towards higher information content, it is postulated by Gregory Chaitin that life has properties of high mutual information, and by Tamvakis that life can be quantified using mutual information density metrics, a generalisation of the concept of Biodiversity.

In a study titled "Natural selection for least action" published in the Proceedings of the Royal Society A., Ville Kaila and Arto Annila of the University of Helsinki describe how the process of natural selection responsible for such local increase in order may be mathematically derived directly from the expression of the second law equation for connected non-equilibrium open systems. The second law of thermodynamics can be written as an equation of motion to describe evolution, showing how natural selection and the principle of least action can be connected by expressing natural selection in terms of chemical thermodynamics. In this view, evolution explores possible paths to level differences in energy densities and so increase entropy most rapidly. Thus, an organism serves as an energy transfer mechanism, and beneficial mutations allow successive organisms to transfer more energy within their environment.

Entropy and the origin of life
The second law of thermodynamics applied to the origin of life is a far more complicated issue than the further development of life, since there is no "standard model" of how the first biological lifeforms emerged, only a number of competing hypotheses. The problem is discussed within the context of abiogenesis, implying gradual pre-Darwinian chemical evolution. In 1924, Alexander Oparin suggested that sufficient energy for generating early lifeforms from non-living molecules was provided in a "primordial soup". The Belgian scientist Ilya Prigogine was awarded with a Nobel Prize in 1977 for an analysis in this area, and one of his main contributions was the concept of dissipative system, which describes the thermodynamics of open systems in non-equilibrium states. A related topic is the probability that life would emerge, which has been discussed in several studies, for example by Russell Doolittle.

The evolution of order, manifested as biological complexity, in living systems and the generation of order in certain non-living systems was proposed to obey a common fundamental principal called "the Darwinian dynamic". The Darwinian dynamic was formulated by first considering how microscopic order is generated in relatively simple non-biological systems that are far from thermodynamic equilibrium (e.g. tornadoes, hurricanes). Consideration was then extended to short, replicating RNA molecules assumed to be similar to the earliest forms of life in the RNA world. It was shown that the underlying order-generating processes in the non-biological systems and in replicating RNA are basically similar. This approach helps clarify the relationship of thermodynamics to evolution as well as the empirical content of Darwin's theory.

In 2009, physicist Karo Michaelian published a thermodynamic dissipation theory for the origin of life in which the fundamental molecules of life; nucleic acids, amino acids, carbohydrates (sugars), and lipids are considered to have been originally produced as microscopic dissipative structures (through Prigogine's dissipative structuring) as pigments at the ocean surface to absorb and dissipate into heat the UVC flux of solar light arriving at Earth's surface during the Archean, just as do organic pigments in the visible region today. These UVC pigments were formed through photochemical dissipative structuring from more common and simpler precursor molecules like HCN and H2O under the UVC flux of solar light. The thermodynamic function of the original pigments (fundamental molecules of life) was to increase the entropy production of the incipient biosphere under the solar photon flux and this, in fact, remains as the most important thermodynamic function of the biosphere today, but now mainly in the visible region where photon intensities are higher and biosynthetic pathways are more complex, allowing pigments to be synthesized from lower energy visible light instead of UVC light which no longer reaches Earth's surface.

Jeremy England developed a hypothesis of the physics of the origins of life, that he calls 'dissipation-driven adaptation'. The hypothesis holds that random groups of molecules can self-organize to more efficiently absorb and dissipate heat from the environment. His hypothesis states that such self-organizing systems are an inherent part of the physical world.

Other types of entropy and their use in defining life
Like a thermodynamic system, an information system has an analogous concept to entropy called information entropy. Here, entropy is a measure of the increase or decrease in the novelty of information. Path flows of novel information show a familiar pattern. They tend to increase or decrease the number of possible outcomes in the same way that measures of thermodynamic entropy increase or decrease the state space. Like thermodynamic entropy, information entropy uses a logarithmic scale: –P(x) log P(x), where P is the probability of some outcome x. Reductions in information entropy are associated with a smaller number of possible outcomes in the information system.

In 1984, Brooks and Wiley introduced the concept of species entropy as a measure of the sum of entropy reduction within species populations in relation to free energy in the environment. Brooks-Wiley entropy looks at three categories of entropy changes: information, cohesion and metabolism. Information entropy here measures the efficiency of the genetic information in recording all the potential combinations of heredity which are present. Cohesion entropy looks at the sexual linkages within a population. Metabolic entropy is the familiar chemical entropy used to compare the population to its ecosystem. The sum of these three is a measure of nonequilibrium entropy that drives evolution at the population level.

A 2022 article by Helman in Acta Biotheoretica suggests identifying a divergence measure of these three types of entropies: thermodynamic entropy, information entropy and species entropy. Where these three are overdetermined, there will be a formal freedom that arises similar to how chirality arises from a minimum number of dimensions. Once there are at least four points for atoms, for example, in a molecule that has a central atom, left and right enantiomers are possible. By analogy, once a threshold of overdetermination in entropy is reached in living systems, there will be an internal state space that allows for ordering of systems operations. That internal ordering process is a threshold for distinguishing living from nonliving systems.

Entropy and the search for extraterrestrial life
In 1964, James Lovelock was among a group of scientists requested by NASA to make a theoretical life-detection system to look for life on Mars during the upcoming space mission. When thinking about this problem, Lovelock wondered "how can we be sure that Martian life, if any, will reveal itself to tests based on Earth's lifestyle?" To Lovelock, the basic question was "What is life, and how should it be recognized?" When speaking about this issue with some of his colleagues at the Jet Propulsion Laboratory, he was asked what he would do to look for life on Mars. To this, Lovelock replied "I'd look for an entropy reduction, since this must be a general characteristic of life."

In 2013, Azua-Bustos and Vega argued that, disregarding the types of lifeforms that might be envisioned both on Earth and elsewhere in the Universe, all should share in common the attribute of decreasing their internal entropy at the expense of free energy obtained from their surroundings. As entropy allows the quantification of the degree of disorder in a system, any envisioned lifeform must have a higher degree of order than its immediate supporting environment. These authors showed that by using fractal mathematics analysis alone, they could readily quantify the degree of structural complexity difference (and thus entropy) of living processes as distinct entities separate from their similar abiotic surroundings. This approach may allow the future detection of unknown forms of life both in the Solar System and on recently discovered exoplanets based on nothing more than entropy differentials of complementary datasets (morphology, coloration, temperature, pH, isotopic composition, etc.).

Entropy in psychology
The notion of entropy as disorder has been transferred from thermodynamics to psychology by Polish psychiatrist Antoni Kępiński, who admitted being inspired by Erwin Schrödinger. In his theoretical framework devised to explain mental disorders (the information metabolism theory), the difference between living organisms and other systems was explained as the ability to maintain order. Contrary to inanimate matter, organisms maintain the particular order of their bodily structures and inner worlds which they impose onto their surroundings and forward to new generations. The life of an organism or the species ceases as soon as it loses that ability. Maintenance of that order requires continual exchange of information between the organism and its surroundings. In higher organisms, information is acquired mainly through sensory receptors and metabolised in the nervous system. The result is action – some form of motion, for example locomotion, speech, internal motion of organs, secretion of hormones, etc. The reactions of one organism become an informational signal to other organisms. Information metabolism, which allows living systems to maintain the order, is possible only if a hierarchy of value exists, as the signals coming to the organism must be structured. In humans that hierarchy has three levels, i.e. biological, emotional, and sociocultural. Kępiński explained how various mental disorders are caused by distortions of that hierarchy, and that the return to mental health is possible through its restoration.

The idea was continued by Struzik, who proposed that Kępiński's information metabolism theory may be seen as an extension of Léon Brillouin's negentropy principle of information. In 2011, the notion of "psychological entropy" was reintroduced to psychologists by Hirsh et al. Similarly to Kępiński, these authors noted that uncertainty management is a critical ability for any organism. Uncertainty, arising due to the conflict between competing perceptual and behavioral affordances, is experienced subjectively as anxiety. Hirsh and his collaborators proposed that both the perceptual and behavioral domains may be conceptualized as probability distributions and that the amount of uncertainty associated with a given perceptual or behavioral experience can be quantified in terms of Claude Shannon's entropy formula.

Objections

Entropy is well defined for equilibrium systems, so objections to the extension of the second law and of entropy to biological systems, especially as it pertains to its use to support or discredit the theory of evolution, have been stated. Living systems and indeed many other systems and processes in the universe operate far from equilibrium.

However, entropy is well defined much more broadly based on the probabilities of a system's states, whether or not the system is a dynamic one (for which equilibrium could be relevant). Even in those physical systems where equilibrium could be relevant, (1) living systems cannot persist in isolation, and (2) the second principle of thermodynamics does not require that free energy be transformed into entropy along the shortest path: living organisms absorb energy from sunlight or from energy-rich chemical compounds and finally return part of such energy to the environment as entropy (generally in the form of heat and low free-energy compounds such as water and carbon dioxide).

A contribution to this line of study, and an attempt to solve those conceptual limits, has been given by Ilya Prigogine throughout all his research, that lead him also to win the Nobel prize in 1977. One of his major contributions was the concept of dissipative system.

See also
Abiogenesis
Adaptive system
Complex systems
Dissipative system
Ecological entropy – a measure of biodiversity in the study of biological ecology
Ectropy – a measure of the tendency of a dynamical system to do useful work and grow more organized
Entropy (order and disorder)
Extropy – a metaphorical term defining the extent of a living or organizational system's intelligence, functional order, vitality, energy, life, experience, and capacity and drive for improvement and growth
Negentropy – a shorthand colloquial phrase for negative entropy
Self-organization - In non-equilibrium thermodynamics, entropy  and dissipative structures are connected to self-organization phenomenon (patterning, orderliness).  Life systems and its subsystems are dissipative sctructures with some degree of self-organization.

References

Further reading
 Schneider, E. and Sagan, D. (2005).  Into the Cool: Energy Flow, Thermodynamics, and Life. University of Chicago Press, Chicago. 
 
 La Cerra, P. (2003). The First Law of Psychology is the Second Law of Thermodynamics: The Energetic Evolutionary Model of the Mind and the Generation of Human Psychological Phenomena, Human Nature Review 3: 440–447.
 Moroz, A. (2011). The Common Extremalities in Biology and Physics. Elsevier Insights, NY. 
 John R. Woodward (2010). Artificial life, the second law of thermodynamics, and Kolmogorov Complexity. Artificial life, the second law of thermodynamics, and Kolmogorov Complexity. 2010 IEEE International Conference on Progress in Informatics and Computing
Vol. 2 Pages 1266-1269 IEEE

External links
 Thermodynamic Evolution of the Universe pi.physik.uni-bonn.de/~cristinz

Thermodynamic entropy
Biological evolution
Biophysics